{{Speciesbox
| image = Tropidurus torquatus.jpg
| status = LC
| status_system = IUCN3.1
| status_ref = <ref name="iucn status 11 November 2021">{{cite iucn |authors= Abdala, S., Arzamendia, V., Embert, D., Fitzgerald, L., Giraudo, A., Kacoliris, F., Montero, R., Pelegrin, N., Scrocchi, G., Williams, J., Nogueira, C. de C., Aparicio, J. & Avila-Pires, T.C.S.   |date=2019 |title='Tropidurus' apurimacus |volume=2019|page=e.T137788491A44955931 |url=https://www.iucnredlist.org/species/137788491/44955931 |access-date=16 December 2021}}</ref> 
| genus = Tropidurus
| species = torquatus
| authority = (Wied-Neuwied, 1820)
| synonyms = *Stellio torquatus Wied-Neuwied, 1820Agama operculata Lichtenstein, 1822Agama brasiliensis Raddi, 1823Agama tuberculata Spix, 1825Tropidurus torquatus — Wied-Neuwied, 1825Taraguira torquata — Gray, 1845Taraguira darwinii Gray, 1845Tropidurus torquatus — Boulenger, 1885Boulenger (1885), p. 176.
}}Tropidurus torquatus is a species of lizard in the family Tropiduridae, the Neotropical ground lizards. Its common name is Amazon lava lizard.

Etymology
The specific name, Tropidurus torquatus, is Latin meaning "adorned with a neck chain or collar".

Geographic range
It is native to South America, where it can be found in Argentina, Bolivia, Brazil, Colombia, French Guiana, Guyana, and Suriname. It is one of the most widely distributed species of genus Tropidurus.

Description
This is a medium-sized lizard with a relatively large head. Its scales are overlapping. The reproductively mature female ranges from  snout-to-vent length (SVL).

Habitat
This lizard lives mainly in open habitat types, especially restinga, part of the Atlantic Forest biome. It may occupy disturbed and degraded restinga. It is also known from the Abrolhos Archipelago, indicating that it can colonize offshore islands. It lives in the Cerrado. It may be found in residential areas, where it is adept at climbing the walls of houses. It is mostly ground-dwelling, living in termite nests and on or under rocks and logs. It is associated with many other animals, including giant ameiva, coati, brown capuchin, guira cuckoo, and false coral snake.

Diet
This species is omnivorous, eating invertebrates and plant material. It favors ants, and on plants it prefers the fruits and flowers. It commonly eats the fruit of Chomelia obtusa, higuerón, and smilaxes. It especially favors the fruit of little coca during the summer.

Territoriality
The male of the species is territorial. The male performs signalling behaviors such as head-bobbing and tail-whipping and exhibits aggressive behaviors such as chasing and fighting with other males. Larger, faster males tend to dominate higher-quality territories, such as those with many hiding places and abundant sunlight. Females prefer higher-quality territories and accept the males guarding them; a male may have access to a harem of several females in a good habitat.

Reproduction
The female may lay several eggs at a time, but a clutch of two is common, particularly in coastal areas. Clutch sizes may be larger in other geographical ranges.

Bipedalism
Another notable behavior of the species is occasional bipedal locomotion. It can run relatively quickly on its hind feet for a limited distance. It carries its body in an oblique position, lifting its hindlimbs high. It swings its forelimbs in phase with its hindlimbs, i.e. swinging its right forelimb as its right hindlimb comes up, and its left with its left.

Biology
Other aspects of the biology of this species have been well-studied, from the production and morphology of its spermatozoa, to the histology of its liver, kidneys, and red blood cells. An inventory of the parasites inside the bodies of a number of lizards found three nematode species, Physaloptera lutzi, Parapharyngodon bainae, and Oswaldofilaria chabaudi, as well as an unidentified tapeworm and an acanthocephalan.

References

Further reading
Boulenger, G.A. 1885. Catalogue of the Lizards in the British Museum (Natural History). Second Edition. Volume II. Iguanidæ... London: Trustees of the British Museum (Natural History). (Taylor and Francis, printers.) xii + 497 pp. + Plates I.- XXIV. (Tropidurus torquatus, pp. 176–177.)
Wied-Neuwied, M. 1820. Reise nach Brasilien in den Jahren 1815 bis 1817 [Volume 1]. Frankfurt am Main: H.L. Bronner. xxxvi + 380 pp. + 5 unnumbered pp. + 25 plates, 2 maps. (Stellio torquatus'', p. 106.)

Tropidurus
Lizards of South America
Reptiles of Argentina
Reptiles of Bolivia
Reptiles of Brazil
Reptiles of Colombia
Reptiles of French Guiana
Reptiles of Guyana
Reptiles of Suriname
Reptiles described in 1820
Taxa named by Prince Maximilian of Wied-Neuwied